Yll Hoxha (born 26 December 1987) is a Kosovar professional footballer who plays for KF Feronikeli in the Superleague of Kosovo and for Kosovo national team as a midfielder. He also holds Albanian citizenship.

Club career
In 2009, he played for Turun Palloseura (TPS) in the Finnish Veikkausliiga, making his league debut against FC Lahti on 31 May 2009.

In the summer of 2009 he signed for Hysi.

On 27 June 2012, Hoxha agreed personal terms and joined newly promoted top flight side Kukësi by penning a two-year contract. He took squad number 20, and played in the second half in club's first ever Albanian Superliga match versus Luftëtari Gjirokastër which ended in a goalless draw.

On 9 July 2015, Hoxha joined fellow Albanian Superliga side Flamurtari Vlorë on a free transfer.

On 1 August 2016, Hoxha official joined Vllaznia Shkodër by signing a two-year contract. He was presented to the media on the very same day. He made his competitive debut with the club on 8 September in the opening league match against Kukësi, which finished in a goalless home draw. On 3 December, after being used briefly during the first part of the season, Hoxha was involved in a hassle with the coach Armando Cungu. After he was excluded from the training session, Hoxha confronted Cungu by saying to him: "What do you have against me? I don't now why you act like this. An angry Cungu responded: "As long as I'm coach here, you shall get no playing time", which led the parties to a brawl. They were separated by the assistant manager Aleksandër Maxhar, and then Hoxha left the training ground. On 16 December, Hoxha officially left the club after terminating his contract by mutual consent. The club also confirmed his departure via a stetament. Hoxha stated that he left the club due to "Cungu injustice".

On 23 December 2016, shortly after his departure from Vllaznia Shkodër, Hoxha returned to Superleague of Kosovo after a five-years hiatus by signing a one-year deal with Feronikeli. He took squad number 99 and during the second part of 2016–17 season scored 4 goals in 14 league appearances as Feronikeli finished 4th.

International career
He made his international debut for Kosovo in its international friendly match against Turkey which ended in a 1–6 home loss.

Personal life
He was married in June 2015 with his partner in a ceremony held in Pristina, Kosovo.

Career statistics

References

External links

1987 births
Living people
Sportspeople from Pristina
Kosovo Albanians
Association football midfielders
Kosovan footballers
Kosovo international footballers
FC Prishtina players
Turun Palloseura footballers
KF Hysi players
FK Kukësi players
Flamurtari Vlorë players
KF Vllaznia Shkodër players
KF Feronikeli players
Football Superleague of Kosovo players
Kategoria Superiore players
Veikkausliiga players
Kosovan expatriate footballers
Kosovan expatriate sportspeople in Albania
Kosovan expatriate sportspeople in Finland
Kosovo pre-2014 international footballers